Spilarctia leopardina is a moth in the family Erebidae. It was described by Vincenz Kollar in 1844. It is found in Tibet, Nepal, the north-western Himalayas and Kashmir.

Subspecies
Spilarctia leopardina leopardina
Spilarctia leopardina dhaulagiriensis Dubatolov & Kishida, 2005 (Nepal)
Spilarctia leopardina rosepuma Dubatolov, Kishida & C. L. Fang, 2005 (Nepal)

References

L
Moths of Asia
Fauna of the Himalayas
Fauna of Tibet
Lepidoptera of Nepal
Taxa named by Vincenz Kollar
Moths described in 1844